Rescue 8 is a syndicated American action adventure crime drama series about Los Angeles County Fire Department (LACFD) Rescue Squad 8. It premiered in 1958 and originally ran for two seasons with syndicated reruns continuing for almost a decade thereafter.

Premise, cast, and characters
Rescue 8, like 26 other rescue units with the LACFD, responded when people faced life-and-death situations. Attached to Fire House Station 8, the unit was headed by veteran paramedic Wes Cannon. Skip Johnson was his assistant.

The show starred Jim Davis as Cameron and Lang Jeffries as Skip Johnson. Nancy Rennick portrayed Patty Johnson, and Mary K. Cleary portrayed Susan Johnson, the wife and daughter, respectively of Skip Johnson. Tom McKee played the chief.

Production
Created by George Draine and Paul Frees, the series was produced by Screen Gems, with directors Dann Cahn and William Witney. Rescue 8 produced 73 half-hour episodes. The first season ran on Tuesday evenings, and the second season on Wednesdays. Bert Leonard was the producer.

Davis and Jeffries learned fire department procedures at a training school, and they did most stunts themselves.

Selected episodes

In the series premiere, "The Ferris Wheel" (September 23, 1958), the firemen must devise a plan to retrieve a woman, who was recently released from a mental institution (Jeanne Bates), and her young daughter (Gina Gillespie) from the top of a Ferris wheel on which they are trapped. Rand Brooks guest stars in the first of his two appearances as Tom Hickey.

In "Subterranean City" (October 14, 1958), rescuers Wes and Skip search for a lost girl in the sewer tunnels and encounter three criminals hiding out underground, one of whom is Skip's nephew, Pete, played by Warren Oates. Pete breaks with his companions and joins the firemen in finding the child.

In "The Cave-In" (December 2, 1958), Will Wright played an elderly man who attempts with shovel and bucket to build a backyard swimming pool for his grandchildren with disastrous results because of the lack of proper shoring.

In "The Bells of Fear" (December 9, 1958), an elderly clockmaker who is trying to repair the chimes in a church clock is trapped inside the instrument just before Christmas Eve. Joe Flynn and Russell Johnson appear in this episode.

In "Calamity Coach" (December 30, 1958), Wes Cameron and Skip Johnson seek to rescue three actors on location when a stagecoach tumbles down a mountain, Douglas Kennedy guest stars.

In "The Secret of the Mission" (January 6, 1959), J. Pat O'Malley plays a priest who is trapped with a would-be thief named Carlos (Rafael Campos) under the roof of a collapsed church.

In "Disaster Town" (February 17, 1959), Gail Kobe plays Ellen Mason, a mother looking for her son, Jimmy, in a ghost town. Jay North, some six months before the premiere of his CBS situation comedy, Dennis the Menace, played the missing son. Craig Hill, the co-star of Whirlybirds, played the father, Chuck Mason. The rescue team is called when the woman is trapped after falling through the floor of an abandoned building.

In "A Handful of Vengeance" (February 24, 1959), Pete Brocco played Stephano, a deranged pyromaniac, who threatens the lives of a warden, his wife, and their two children and then turns on the rescuers as well.

In "International Incident" (March 17, 1959), Robert Cabal plays a foreign prince, Raj Tamal, who is trapped in an automobile accident and is also the target of an assassin, portrayed by Vito Scotti. Denver Pyle guest stars as Sergeant Frank Hogan.

In "The Third Strike" (December 2, 1959), John Beradino, a professional baseball player-turned-actor, was cast in the role of a baseball player who loses consciousness when struck by a wild pitch. He soon awakes with short-term amnesia.
 
On January 6, 1960, Jay Silverheels of The Lone Ranger played an American Indian fireman fighting a forest fire in the episode "Leap of Life".

In "Breakdown" (March 31, 1960), one of the last episodes of Rescue 8, Robert Redford plays Danny Tilford, a mentally-disturbed young man trapped in the wreckage of his family garage.

Other guest stars

Comparisons
 
The real Los Angeles County Fire Department Station 8 is at 7643 West Santa Monica Boulevard in West Hollywood, California. The real Station 8 was also depicted as "Station 10" in the opening scenes of the pilot movie for Emergency! in 1972.

The Rescue 8 truck depicted in the series was a 1958 GMC Suburban equipped with classic, front-bumper General Motors "dagmars". According to several Internet sources, the real Rescue 8 squad that existed during the 1958–60 timeframe of the series employed the use of a 1956 Chevrolet panel-van truck (a somewhat less robust version of the nearly identical GMC truck).

Rescue 8 shows more physically oriented rescues than seen 14 years later in the debut of the television series Emergency! (1972–77), which also featured the Los Angeles County Fire Department's rescue squads. The latter show had physically oriented rescues, but also included emergency medical rescues. This is because rescue firemen were not then trained as paramedics until 12 years after the premier of Rescue 8, acquiring this expanded role with the passage of the Wedsworth-Townsend Pilot Paramedic Act in 1970. The creation of Paramedic Act itself was the main plot theme of the pilot movie of Emergency!.

Episodes

Season 1 (1958–59)

Season 2 (1959–60)

References

External links 

 
 Rescue 8 at CVTA

1958 American television series debuts
1960 American television series endings
1950s American drama television series
1960s American drama television series
American action adventure television series
Black-and-white American television shows
First-run syndicated television programs in the United States
Television series about firefighting
Television series by Screen Gems
Television series by Sony Pictures Television
Television shows set in Los Angeles
West Hollywood, California